Blanchett or Blanchette is a given name or surname of French origin.

People with this surname include:
Andrulla Blanchette (born 1966), a female bodybuilder
Cate Blanchett (born 1969), Australian actress
Christopher Blanchett (born 1982), English broadcast journalist
Danny Blanchett (born 1987), footballer
Ian Neale Blanchett (born 1975), Australian born English cricketer
Louis Blanchette (1739–93), explorer and founder of Saint Charles, Missouri
Oliva Blanchette (born 1929), American philosopher
Peter Blanchette (born 1960) American musician, inventor of the archguitar.
Patricia Blanchette, American philosopher

People with this given name include:
Blanchette Brunoy (1915-2005), actress
Blanchette Hooker Rockefeller (1909–92), wife of John D. Rockefeller III
The heroine of Eugène Brieux's 1892 play Blanchette.

Wine grapes
Several French wine grapes have Blanchette as a synonym. These include:
Blanchette (grape), another name for the wine grape Chasselas
Blanchette rouge, another name for the wine grape Canari noir
Mondeuse blanche, a wine grape which is also known as Blanchette
Verdesse, another wine grape which is also known as Blanchette

Other uses
Blanchette Cemetery, Beaumont, Texas is the resting-place of Blind Willie Johnson (1897-1945), Baptist minister and bluesman